Bayning is a surname. Notable people with the surname include:

Baron Bayning, of Foxley in the County of Berkshire, a title in the Peerage of Great Britain
Charles Powlett, 2nd Baron Bayning (1785–1823), British peer and Tory Member of Parliament
Charles Townshend, 1st Baron Bayning PC (1728–1810), British politician
Henry Powlett, 3rd Baron Bayning (1797–1866), British peer and clergyman
Viscount Bayning, of Sudbury, was a title created for the 1st Baron Bayning on 8 March 1628
Viscountess Bayning, of Foxley, was a title in the Peerage of England
Paul Bayning (disambiguation), multiple people